Tomás Esteban Correa Miranda, known as Tomi Correa (born December 5, 1984) is a Spanish footballer who plays for Spanish club Atlético Victoria.

References

External links

1984 births
Living people
Spanish footballers
CD Logroñés footballers
SC Rheindorf Altach players
Austrian Football Bundesliga players
Spanish expatriate footballers
Expatriate footballers in Austria
Spanish expatriate sportspeople in Austria
SV Grödig players
Association football forwards